Joostella marina is a Gram-negative strictly aerobic, non-spore-forming and non-motile bacterium from the genus of Joostella which has been isolated from the Sea of Japan.

References

External links
  microbewiki

Flavobacteria
Bacteria described in 2008